The Illinois Thunder were an indoor soccer club (based in Rockford, Illinois) that competed in the National Professional Soccer League.

After the 1991/92 season, the team became the Denver Thunder.

References

Year-by-year

Defunct indoor soccer clubs in the United States
National Professional Soccer League (1984–2001) teams
Sports teams in Rockford, Illinois
Soccer clubs in Illinois
1992 disestablishments in Illinois
1990 establishments in Illinois
Association football clubs established in 1990
Association football clubs disestablished in 1992